Morrow County Courthouse may refer to:

Morrow County Courthouse (Ohio)
Morrow County Courthouse (Oregon)